The 2001–02 UEFA Futsal Cup was the 16th edition of Europe's premier club futsal tournament and the 1st edition under the current UEFA Futsal Cup format.

Preliminary round

Group 1

Group 2

Group 3

Group 4

Group 5

Group 6

Group 7

Group 8

Final phase

Group A

Group B

Knockout stage

Semi-finals

Final

The 2002 UEFA Futsal Cup Final was played at 15:00 CEST on 3 March 2002 at the Pavilhão Atlântico in Lisbon, Portugal. Playas de Castellón won the match 5–1.

External links
 uefa.com

UEFA Futsal Champions League
Cup